Marta San Adrián Rocandio (born 22 February 2000), often known as Sanadri, is a Spanish professional footballer who plays as a forward for Liga F club Deportivo Alavés.

Club career
Sanadri started her career in Añorga's academy.

References

External links
Profile at La Liga

2000 births
Living people
Women's association football forwards
Spanish women's footballers
Footballers from San Sebastián
Añorga KKE players
Deportivo Alavés Gloriosas players
Primera División (women) players
Segunda Federación (women) players